Patria (Homeland) is an album released by the Chilean folk group Quilapayún in 1975.

Track listing
“Mi patria”/My Homeland (Fernando Alegría – Eduardo Carrasco)
“El paso del ñandú”/The passing of the ñandu (Rodolfo Parada)
“Te recuerdo Amanda”/I remember you Amanda (Víctor Jara)
“Vals de Colombes”/Colombes Waltz (Eduardo Carrasco)
“Continuará nuestra lucha”/Our struggle shall continue (Pablo Neruda – Rodolfo Parada)
“1.Recitado”/1. Narrative (Quilapayún – Eduardo Carrasco)
“2.Cueca autobiográfica”/Autobiographical Cueca Dance (Hernán Gómez – Quilapayún)
“Ventolera”/Windstorm (Eduardo Carrasco - Hugo Lagos)
“Padre, hermano y camarada”/Father, brother and comrade (Isadora Aguirre - Cirilo Vila)
“Machu Picchu (Hugo Lagos – Eduardo Carrasco)
“Un son para Cuba”/A son (music) for Cuba (Pablo Neruda – Quilapayún)
“Patria de multitudes”/Homeland of multitudes (Hernán Gómez – Eduardo Carrasco)

Personnel
Eduardo Carrasco
Carlos Quezada
Willy Oddó 
Hernán Gómez 
Rodolfo Parada 
Hugo Lagos 
Guillermo García

1976 albums